Once Before I Die is a 1966 war drama starring Ursula Andress and directed by then-husband John Derek, from whom she was officially divorced before the film was released, and who also appeared in the film. It was based on a 1945 novel Quit for the Next by Lieutenant Anthony March.

This was Derek's first film as director.

It was also known as No Toys for Christmas.

Plot
Shortly after the Attack on Pearl Harbor, the Japanese attack the Philippine islands. A group of polo-playing soldiers of the 26th Cavalry Regiment (United States) and their families are surprised while playing a polo game.

Major Bailey orders his Swiss fiancée Alex to leave the country, promising to meet her in San Francisco. Bailey leads his men back to Manila, but the roads are jammed with fugitives – including Alex who delayed her return home to get her pet dog.

During the ensuing journey, Bailey's men kill a Japanese pilot who has jumped out of his plane. It becomes clear that Lt Custer is sadistic and enjoying the war.

Bailey leads his men to a house where there is an enemy attack. Bailey sends Alex away – but before she leaves she witnesses him being accidentally killed by an exploding hand grenade.

Alex forms a bond with a virginal soldier and he pleads with her to have sex with him for his first and only time as he thinks that otherwise he shall probably die without ever having sex (hence the title of the film). At first Alex refuses but she takes pity on him and agrees to his wish. Later on he is killed fighting the Japanese.

Lieutenant Custer leads a pointless raid on an enemy stronghold, resulting in a massacre in which all of the Americans are killed except him. Alex and Lt Custer wander down to a beach where Custer is shot dead by a lone Japanese Soldier. Alex is forced to kill the young Japanese soldier in self-defence and is left alone on the beach.

Cast
Ursula Andress as  Alex
John Derek as  Bailey
Richard Jaeckel as  Lt. Custer
Ron Ely as Captain
Rod Lauren as Soldier
Vance Skarstedt
Allen Pinson
Greg Martin
Renato Robles
Fred Galang
Andres Centenera
Rod Francisco
Nello Nayo
Mario Taquibulos
Eva Vivar

Production
Anthony March was a lieutenant in the US Cavalry who served in China and Burman in World War II. He wrote his debut novel Quit for the March at the encouragement of Maxwell Perkins. It was published by Scribner's in 1945. March's obituary said it had "slight initial success but was rediscovered two decades later."

Once Before I Die was the debut directorial effort from John Derek, a photographer and a former actor who finalized his divorce from the film's lead actress Ursula Andress eight months before its release.

Filming began on location in the Philippines in 1964. Filming was difficult, and the cast and crew were not fully paid. However Jaeckel later said the film was one of his favorites.
 
During the filming Rod Lauren met Filipino actress Nida Blanca, whom he later married. In 2001 Lauren fled the Philippines, charged with Blanca's murder. He killed himself in 2007.

The film was known as No Toys for Christmas and The 26th Cavalry.  Jock Mahoney makes an uncredited appearance in the film.

The film includes Andress appearing in a nude scene. Stills from this were later sold to Playboy magazine. "If we were ashamed of them we wouldn't have published then", said Andress. "It's always a matter of taste, intention and attitude. Striptease can be vulgar or artistic. The same thing applies to nudity."

Reception
The film was not released properly until 1967, when it came out through Warner Bros-Seven Arts, who distributed the Andress vehicle She (1965). The movie was not a financial success.

See also
List of American films of 1965
 List of American films of 1966

References

External links 
 

1965 drama films
1965 films
Pacific War films
Films set in the Philippines
Films based on American novels
American war drama films
Films directed by John Derek
Films shot in the Philippines
1966 drama films
1966 films
1960s English-language films
1960s American films